Justicia may refer to:

 Justicia (album), by Eddie Palmieri, 1969
 Justicia (Madrid), a ward in the Madrid city center
 Justicia (plant), a genus of flowering plants in the family Acanthaceae
 Justicia mayor, a 19th century Spanish Empire law enforcement and judicial officer 
 SS Justicia, a British ship
 "Justicia", a 2018 song by Silvestre Dangond and Natti Natasha
 Justicia, the main sculpture at the Glorieta de las mujeres que luchan, in Mexico City

People
 Justicia Acuña (1893–1980), Chilean engineer
 Pepe Justicia (born 1960), Spanish flamenco guitarist
 Jorge Rojas Justicia (born 1983), Spanish footballer

See also
 Justitia (disambiguation)
 Justiciar